Harold Matson (February 26, 1898 – January 5, 1988) was an American literary agent and founder of the Harold Matson Company. His clients included Evelyn Waugh, C. S. Forester, Arthur Koestler, Malcolm Lowry, William Saroyan, Allen Drury, Robert Ruark, Herman Wouk, Evan S. Connell, Flannery O'Connor and Richard Condon.

Early life
Matson was born in Grand Rapids, Michigan and grew up in San Francisco.

Career
The New York Times called Matson "one of the most influential figures in book publishing." The $106,000 sale of the paperback rights to Robert Ruark's novel Something of Value set a record at the time. On his death, Ruark left his Rolls-Royce car to Matson.

References

Archives 

 Finding aid to Harold Matson Company Inc. records at Columbia University. Rare Book & Manuscript Library.

Literary agents
1988 deaths
1898 births
Businesspeople from Grand Rapids, Michigan
20th-century American businesspeople